This is a list of broadcast television stations that are licensed in the U.S. state of Idaho.

Full-power stations
VC refers to the station's PSIP virtual channel. RF refers to the station's physical RF channel.

Defunct full-power stations
Channel 5: KIDA - Sun Valley/Twin Falls (2003-6/12/2009)
Channel 6: KFXD-TV - Nampa (6/18/1953-8/12/1953)
Channel 6: KCIX-TV - Nampa/Boise (11/9/1958-3/24/1960)
Channel 6: KTLE - Pocatello (7/3/1959-1/23/1961 and 9/8/1962-2/12/1964)
Channel 19: KBGH - ETV - Filer/Twin Falls (1994–2009)

LPTV stations

Translators

Idaho

Television stations